Novyye Karyavdy (Yañı Qaryawźı) is a rural locality (a selo) in Chekmagushevsky District, Bashkortostan, Russia. The population was 276 as of 2010. There are 2 streets.

Geography 
Novyye Karyavdy is located 26 km southwest of Chekmagush (the district's administrative centre) by road. Verkhniye Karyavdy is the nearest rural locality.

References 

Rural localities in Chekmagushevsky District